Bramalea—Gore—Malton was a provincial electoral district in Southern Ontario, Canada. It was created for the 2007 provincial election. All of the district was carved from Bramalea—Gore—Malton—Springdale.

The riding includes the part of Mississauga north of the 401 and east of Dixie Road and the part of  Brampton east of a line following Dixie Road to Bovaird Drive to Torbram Road.

In 2018, the district was dissolved into Brampton East, Mississauga—Malton, Brampton Centre, and Brampton North.

The riding has the unusual distinction of only ever having been held by members of Canada's Sikh visible minority.

Members of Provincial Parliament

Election results

		

|align="left" colspan=2|Liberal  hold
|align="right"|Swing
|align="right"|  +5.84

^ Change is from redistributed results

2007 electoral reform referendum

Sources

Elections Ontario Past Election Results

Former provincial electoral districts of Ontario
Politics of Brampton
Politics of Mississauga